Alonso López González (born 21 December 2001) is a Spanish motorcycle racer, currently competing for Speed Up Racing in the 2023 Moto2 World Championship.

Career

Early career
In 2016 and 2017 he competed in the FIM CEV Moto3 Junior Championships finishing 3rd overall in his second season.

Moto3 World Championship

Estrella Galicia 0,0 (2018–2019)
In  he graduated to the Moto3 World Championship where he replaced Enea Bastianini in the Estrella Galicia team.

Sterilgarda Max Racing Team (2020)
In  he competed in the Moto3 World Championship riding for Sterilgarda Max Racing Team.

Moto2 World Championship

Speed Up Racing (2021–Present)
In  he competed to the Moto2 World Championship.

Career statistics

FIM CEV Moto3 Junior World Championship

Races by year
(key) (Races in bold indicate pole position, races in italics indicate fastest lap)

FIM CEV Moto2 European Championship

Races by year
(key) (Races in bold indicate pole position, races in italics indicate fastest lap)

Grand Prix motorcycle racing

By season

By class

Races by year
(key) (Races in bold indicate pole position, races in italics indicate fastest lap)

 Half points awarded as less than two thirds of the race distance (but at least three full laps) was completed.

External links

 

2001 births
Living people
Spanish motorcycle racers
Moto3 World Championship riders
Sportspeople from Madrid
Moto2 World Championship riders